Ferocactus gracilis, or the fire barrel cactus, is a species of Ferocactus from Northwestern Mexico. This cactus gets its common name from the striking red coloration of its defensive spines and flowers.

Subspecies

References

External links
 
 

gracilis
Flora of Mexico
Plants described in 1933